The 25th edition of the Men's Asian Amateur Boxing Championships were held from June 7 to June 13, 2009 in Zhuhai, China.

Medal summary

Medal table

References
amateur-boxing
AIBA

External links
Asian Boxing Confederation

2009
Asian Boxing
Boxing
Sport in Zhuhai
Sports competitions in Guangdong
June 2009 sports events in China